= Random man not excluded =

Concept in population genetics

Random man not excluded (RMNE) is a type of measure in population genetics to estimate the probability that an individual randomly picked out of the general population would not be excluded from matching a given piece of genetic data.

RMNE is frequently employed in cases where other types of tests such as random match possibility are not possible because the sample in question is degraded or contaminated with multiple sources of DNA.

== See also ==
- Random match possibility
